Ludwig Steeg (22 December 1894 – 6 September 1945), German Nazi politician, was appointed City President (Lord Mayor) of Berlin from 1940 to 1945.

Biography
Steeg was born in Ottweiler near Saarbrücken, the son of a teacher. As a young man he moved to Berlin and gained a junior post in the city administration. In World War I he served in the infantry, becoming a second lieutenant. Returning to Berlin in 1919, he rejoined the administration and was among other things responsible for city's cleaning services. He joined the Nazi Party in 1933, and thus gained rapid promotion as the majority of Berlin's civil servants who were loyal to the Social Democrats were removed from office. He became deputy to Julius Lippert, the State Commissioner of Berlin, who also held the traditional title of Oberbürgermeister.

The real power in Berlin under the Nazis was, however, the Gauleiter (party regional leader), Joseph Goebbels, and in July 1940 he persuaded Hitler to dismiss Lippert, who he believed had become a rival to his authority. Steeg, a loyal nonentity, was appointed in his place, "for lack of anyone better," as Goebbels put it. Steeg became Oberbürgermeister and Stadtpräsident (head of the city). In April 1944 Goebbels took over as Stadtpräsident, but Steed remained as Oberbürgermeister.

As Lord Mayor Steeg was responsible, under Goebbels, for the city's budget, traffic, building regulations, schools, youth facilities and health services. All these came under increasing strain as World War II went on, partly because of the inexperience of the Nazi loyalists who had been placed on responsible jobs following the removal of experienced but politically unreliable officials, and partly because of the increasing shortage of staff as a result of wartime conscription.

Steeg was also responsible for preparing Berlin for the air-raids which were widely expected, and which began to occur with increasingly frequency and severity from 1943. He prepared plans for the production and distribution of food, the construction of shelters and the evacuation of women and children. About a million people were evacuated: even so, between 1943 and 1945 50,000 Berliners were killed in air-raids. He performed these tasks competently but did not exercise a public leadership role. This was exercised by Goebbels, who in 1944 took over the office of Stadtpräsident from Steeg.

During the last months of the war Steeg was eclipsed by Goebbels in preparing the defences of Berlin against the approaching Red Army. He does not seem to have played any significant role in these events: he is not mentioned in any of the histories of Berlin at this time, such as Cornelius Ryan's The Last Battle or Anthony Reid and David Fisher's The Fall of Berlin. Nevertheless, his post as Oberbürgermeister made him the symbolic head of the capital of the German Reich. When the city surrendered to the Soviet forces on 2 May 1945, he was arrested and taken to a Soviet internment camp, where he died in unexplained circumstances in September.

1894 births
1945 deaths
People from Neunkirchen (German district)
People from the Rhine Province
German Army personnel of World War I
Nazi Party politicians
Mayors of Berlin
Military personnel from Saarland